Full Sutton Airfield  is an unlicensed aerodrome located  east of York in the East Riding of Yorkshire, England. It is located adjacent to, and south-east of, Full Sutton Prison.

The Airfield occupies the location of the former RAF station Full Sutton. It previously held a CAA Ordinary Licence that allowed flights for the public transport of passengers, or for flying instruction as authorised by the licensee, Full Sutton Flying Centre Limited. This licence was given up in 2011. The airfield is not licensed for night use.

Facilities and services
Full Sutton provides instruction for PPL and CPL students. The airfield employs five flying instructors, two full-time, and three part-time.
Facilities include a club house for the airfield flying club, hangars, control room, and on-site aircraft maintenance. It provides hire for the following aircraft types:
 Cessna 150
 Cessna 172
 Piper PA 28 Cherokee 140
 Piper PA 28 Warrior 160
 Slingsby T67 Firefly
 Cessna 310

Runway
Runway 04/22 at Full Sutton is a grass surface,  strip and is the only runway in use at the aerodrome.

References

Airports in England
Transport in the East Riding of Yorkshire
Airports in Yorkshire